Bronzell LaJames Miller (October 12, 1971 – December 21, 2013) was a professional American football player and entertainer.  As a football player he played for the University of Utah in college and then a series of professional teams being drafted by the St. Louis Rams in 1995.  He spent a season with the Jacksonville Jaguars in 1996,  the Calgary Stampeders from 1997-2001 and ending with the Los Angeles Avengers of the Arena Football League in 2001.  As an actor he appeared in feature films including Bringing Down the House, Mr. 3000, Slow, The Luck of the Irish, as well as television shows and commercials. He also worked as a print model for the YMCA of Greater New York and performed voice work for Milwaukee Radio Group.

College career
A two-sport athlete, Miller played both college basketball and football from 1990–1992 at Eastern Arizona Junior College and Highline Community College.  He then was given a full scholarship at the University of Utah, where he played college football for the Utes in 1993–1994. Miller received several honors and played in the East-West Shrine Game and the Freedom Bowl. Miller participated in the Utes' November 19, 1994 win over Brigham Young University.

Personal life
In 1991 while both attending the University of Utah, Bronzell met and married his first wife Marnie Oliver. They had 3 children Bronzell junior, Breezell and Elijah. He also had a step son Stetson. In 1999 the couple divorced and Bronzell moved to Minnesota where he met and married his second wife Jane Krohn in 2000. They were married for 10 years and had 5 children. Breonne, Isaiah, Aaliyah, Arielle and Isaac. Bronzell also has an older daughter Alesha from a college relationship. In July 2010, Bronzell was diagnosed with 3rd stage multiple myeloma. He underwent chemo, radiation, bone marrow transplants  and several other treatments in an attempt to prolong his life.  In December 2013 he returned to Utah with his first wife and children to receive hospice care for end stage cancer. Miller died at home with family on December 21, 2013 at the age of 42.

NFL career
Miller was drafted in the 1995 NFL Draft by the St. Louis Rams as a linebacker. During the season, he left the Rams to join the Jacksonville Jaguars.  Following his NFL years, Miller joined the Calgary Stampeders of the Canadian Football League, where he led his team to the Grey Cup Championship in 1998 playing defensive end. Miller retired from professional football in 2001, after a series of back and ankle injuries.

External links

1971 births
2013 deaths
Deaths from multiple myeloma
American football linebackers
American football defensive ends
Utah Utes football players
St. Louis Rams players
Amsterdam Admirals players
Jacksonville Jaguars players
Calgary Stampeders players
Eastern Arizona Gila Monsters football players
American male voice actors
Players of American football from Seattle
Male models from Washington (state)
Deaths from cancer in Utah